The 2015–16 Evansville Purple Aces men's basketball team represented the University of Evansville during the 2015–16 NCAA Division I men's basketball season. The Purple Aces, led by ninth year head coach Marty Simmons, played their home games at the Ford Center and were members of the Missouri Valley Conference. They finished the season 25–9, 12–6 in Missouri Valley play to finish in a tie for second place. They defeated Missouri State and Indiana State in the Missouri Valley tournament to advance to the championship game where they lost to Northern Iowa. Despite having 25 wins, they did not participate in a postseason tournament.

Previous season
The Purple Aces finished the 2014–15 season 24–12, 9–9 in MVC play to finish in fifth place. They lost in the quarterfinals of the Missouri Valley tournament to Illinois State. They were invited to the CollegeInsider.com Tournament where they defeated IPFW, Eastern Illinois, Louisiana–Lafayette, Tennessee–Martin, and Northern Arizona to become CIT champions.

Departures

Class of 2015 recruits

Roster

Schedule

|-
!colspan=9 style=""| Exhibition

|-
!colspan=9 style=""| Non-conference regular season

|-
!colspan=9 style=""| Missouri Valley regular season

|-
!colspan=9 style=""| Missouri Valley tournament

|-

|-

References

Evansville Purple Aces men's basketball seasons
Evansville
Evan
Evan